Young Lust: The Aerosmith Anthology is a 2001 compilation album by American hard rock band Aerosmith. It features album cuts and hits from their Geffen Records years – between Done with Mirrors and Get a Grip – plus rarer material, B-sides, and live versions. It was reissued in 2005 as Gold, with a different cover.

Track listing

Personnel
Steven Tyler – lead vocals, keyboards, harmonica, mandolin
Joe Perry – lead guitar, appalachian dulcimer, backing vocals
Brad Whitford – rhythm guitar
Tom Hamilton – bass
Joey Kramer – drums

Additional musicians
Russ Irwin – Keyboards, Vocals (background)
Thom Gimbel – Keyboards, Vocals (background)

Additional personnel
Mike Ragogna – compilation producer
Aerosmith – producer
Michael Beinhorn – producer
Russell Simmons – producer
Ted Templeman – producer
Rick Rubin – producer
Bruce Fairbairn – producer
Jack Douglas – producer, mixing
Beth Stempel – production coordination
Vartan – art direction
Michael Fraser – mixing
Brendan O'Brien – mixing
Jeremy Holiday – A&R assistance
Sal Nunziato – A&R assistance
Barry Korkin – editorial assistant
Erick Labson – mastering
Kelly Martinez – licensing
Geri Miller – liner notes
David Campbell – conductor, string arrangements
Gabrielle Revere – photography
Norman Seeff – photography
Neal Preston – photography
Dennis Keeley – photography
Gene Kirkland – photography

Reception
"A slightly confusing package," suggested Classic Rock. "For while claiming to sidestep the band's 70s material in favour of the group's later, outside-writer-bolstered tunes, the compilers just couldn't resist including 'Dream On' and 'Walk This Way'… There's a great version of The Doors' 'Love Me Two Times', 'Livin' on the Edge' sees the band stomp assuredly into the 90s, and even the bubblegum ballad 'Crazy' is delivered with a conviction that is beguiling."

Charts

Weekly charts

Year-end charts

Certifications

Release history

References

External links
 

Albums produced by Bruce Fairbairn
Albums produced by Jack Douglas (record producer)
Albums produced by Rick Rubin
Albums produced by Ted Templeman
2001 greatest hits albums
Geffen Records compilation albums
Aerosmith compilation albums
Polydor Records compilation albums